Robert Milligan Coleman (June 7, 1878 – September 7, 1941) was an AMmerican college football player, coach, and physician. A native of Lexington, Kentucky, Coleman first attended local Kentucky University, and later coached there.

Early years
Coleman was born to Benjamin Lindsay Coleman and Isabel Milligan.

University of Virginia
Coleman was then a prominent running back for the Virginia Cavaliers football teams of the University of Virginia. He weighed 142 pounds.

1899
Coleman was selected All-Southern in 1899.

1901
He was captain of the 1901 team. Coleman was selected All-Southern.

References

External links
 

1878 births
1941 deaths
American football halfbacks
Physicians from Kentucky
Transylvania Pioneers football coaches
Virginia Cavaliers football players
All-Southern college football players
Coaches of American football from Kentucky
Players of American football from Lexington, Kentucky